Dr. Andrés Domingo y Morales del Castillo (4 September 1892 in Santiago de Cuba – 1 June 1979 in Miami, Florida United States) was a Cuban jurist, Senator (1944-1952), politician, government minister and  interim President of Cuba.

He was the son of Andrés Domingo y Romero and Antonia Morales del Castillo y Durive. He graduated from the University of Havana School of Law. He served as Judge and later Senator in 1944 and 1948.

Domingo served as Minister of Presidency, Justice, Housing, Defense and Foreign Minister during Fulgencio Batista’s terms as president. On August 14, 1954, Batista made Domingo President of Cuba so that he could run for president. Once Batista was sworn in as president on February 24, 1955, Domingo resumed his ministerial positions.  Domingo was to run for President of Cuba in the election of 1958. He never married.

References
 Andrés Domingo y Morales del Castillo, Jurista, Ministro, Senador y Presidente, Antolin Gonzalez del Valle Rios (Wilmington, North Carolina, Ediciones Patria, 1980)  
 Los Propietarios de Cuba 1958, Guillermo Jimenez Soler (Havana, Cuba: Editorial de Ciencias Sociales, 2007)

Presidents of Cuba
Defense ministers of Cuba
Housing ministers of Cuba
Justice ministers of Cuba
Foreign ministers of Cuba
1892 births
1979 deaths
1950s in Cuba
20th-century Cuban lawyers
20th-century Cuban politicians
Grand Crosses 1st class of the Order of Merit of the Federal Republic of Germany